Cupressus guadalupensis, the Guadalupe cypress, is a species of cypress from Guadalupe Island in the Pacific Ocean off western North America.

Distribution
The Guadalupe cypress, Cupressus guadalupensis,  is endemic to Mexico, found only on Guadalupe Island in the Pacific Ocean west of Baja California.

Cupressus guadalupensis has previously been listed as being the same species as Cupressus forbesii, which had been listed as a variety of C. guadalupensis in the past. Recent analysis, however, has placed C. forbesii as a separate, albeit closely related, species.

Description
The foliage grows in dense sprays, dark green to gray-green in color. The leaves are scale-like, 2–5 mm long, and produced on rounded (not flattened) shoots.

The seed cones are spherical to oblong, 12–35 mm long, with 6 to 10 scales, green at first, maturing gray-brown to gray about 20–24 months after pollination. The cones remain closed for many years, only opening after the parent tree is killed in a wildfire, thereby allowing the seeds to colonise the bare ground exposed by the fire. The male cones are 3–5 mm long, and release pollen in February–March. A specimen survived at Cistus Nursery outside of Portland, OR during the winter of 2013-14, where temperatures went to -11.1111 Celsius.

Conservation - restoration
Guadalupe Island had a population of numerous but old and weak trees in 2000. As a viable conifer woodland species they disappeared rapidly from the late 19th century onwards, as hordes of introduced feral goats ate the seedlings that germinated for over a century. One major subpopulation was destroyed entirely, and the isolated stands were nearly destroyed. Also, with the animals destroying most vegetation, and especially the island's cloud forest, the water table dropped, further jeopardizing the remaining two main subpopulations.

The principal habitats were fenced in by 2001, and long-awaited removal of goats was effectively completed by 2005.  The first young plants in 150 years or so are now able to grow and mature without being grazed away. The present small population of 100 extant trees are vulnerable to long term viability. It appears this cypress is more vulnerable to drought than other island native plants, such as the Guadalupe variety of Monterey Pine (Pinus radiata var. binata), and so the population could decline further with future climate changes. Habitat and watershed restoration and support projects are ongoing by Mexican conservation organization programs.

Cupressus guadalupensis is considered a vulnerable species by the IUCN.

Footnotes

References
 
  (2003): Recent conservation efforts and current status of the flora of Guadalupe Island, Baja California, Mexico. Presentation at Taller sobre la Restauración y Conservación de Isla Guadalupe ["Workshop on restoration and conservation of Guadalupe Island"]. Instituto Nacional de Ecología, November 13–14, 2003. HTML abstract.
  (2003): On the urgency of conservation on Guadalupe Island, Mexico: is it a lost paradise? Biodiversity and Conservation 12(5): 1073–1082.  (HTML abstract)
 Little, D. P. (2006). Evolution and circumscription of the true Cypresses. Syst. Bot. 31 (3): 461-480.

External links

Gymnosperm Database: C. guadalupensis var. guadalupensis
Gymnosperm Database: C. guadalupensis var. forbesii

guadalupensis
Trees of Baja California
Trees of Mexican Pacific Islands
Endemic flora of Mexico
~
Natural history of the California chaparral and woodlands
Trees of Mediterranean climate
Plants described in 1879
Vulnerable plants